The 2021–22 Coppa Italia Serie C was the 49th season of the Coppa Italia Serie C, the cup competition for Serie C clubs.

Juventus U23 were the defending champions having won their first title in June 2020 against Ternana, with a 2–1 final score in the final.

The 2020–21 season was not held due to the COVID-19 pandemic.

Participating teams

Group A (20 teams) 

 AlbinoLeffe
 FeralpiSalò
 Fiorenzuola
 Giana Erminio
 Juventus U23
 Lecco
 Legnago
 Mantova
 Padova
 Pergolettese
 Piacenza
 Pro Patria
 Pro Sesto
 Pro Vercelli
 Renate
 Seregno
 Südtirol
 Trento
 Triestina
 Virtus Verona

Group B (20 teams) 

 Ancona-Matelica
 Carrarese
 Cesena
 Fermana
 Grosseto
 Gubbio
 Imolese
 Lucchese
 Modena
 Montevarchi
 Olbia
 Pescara
 Pistoiese
 Pontedera
 Reggiana
 Siena 
 Teramo
 Virtus Entella
 Vis Pesaro
 Viterbese

Group C (20 teams)

 ACR Messina
 Avellino
 Bari
 Campobasso
 Catania
 Catanzaro
 Fidelis Andria
 Foggia
 Juve Stabia
 Latina
 Monopoli
 Monterosi
 Paganese
 Palermo
 Picerno
 Potenza
 Taranto
 Turris
 Vibonese
 Virtus Francavilla

Format and seeding 
The 60 teams in the 2021–22 Serie C entered the competition at various stages, as follows:

 First phase (one-legged fixtures)
 First round (one-legged): it is contested by the 56 teams who do not participate in the Coppa Italia. 
 Second round (one-legged): it is contested by the 28 winners of the first round and the four teams that participate in Coppa Italia. 
 Second phase
 Round of 16 (one-legged): it is contested by the 16 winners of the second round.
 Quarter-finals (one-legged)
 Semi-finals (two-legged)
 Final (two-legged)

Round dates 
The schedule of each rounds were announced on 27 July 2021.

First round 
The draw was made on 9 August 2021.

Group 1

Group 2

Group 3

Group 4

Second round 
The round is contested by the winners of the previous round and the four teams that participated in the 2021–22 Coppa Italia.

Group A

Group B

Group C

Group D

Round of 16

Quarter-finals

Semi-finals

First leg

Second leg

Final

First leg

Second leg

Bracket (from second round)

Goalscorers 

Statistics include the goals scored by Pro Patria and Lucchese against FeralpiSalò and Legnago, for a total of 154 goals.

Own goals

References 

Coppa Italia Serie C seasons
Coppa Italia Serie C
Italy